Thwar Lu Soe Dar Myo Taw Tat Tal is a 2012 Burmese drama film, directed by Nyi Nyi Htun Lwin starring Kyaw Ye Aung, Pyay Ti Oo, Nay Min, Soe Myat Thuzar, Eaindra Kyaw Zin and Pearl Win.

Cast
Kyaw Ye Aung as U Htun Khine
Pyay Ti Oo as Maung Maung Latt
Nay Min as Nay Min
Soe Myat Thuzar as Daw Tin May
Eaindra Kyaw Zin as Mu Di Tar
Pearl Win as Pan Eu
Bay Lu Wa as U Kyauk Tine
Khin Hlaing as Yin Maung
Khin Soe Paing as Daw Swal Mi
Khine Tin as U Myint Aung

References

2012 films
2010s Burmese-language films
Burmese drama films
Films shot in Myanmar
2012 drama films